The 2022 ICC Women's World Cup Final was a Women's One Day International (WODI) cricket match played between Australia and England to decide the winner of the 2022 Women's World Cup. Australia won by 71 runs to secure their seventh World Cup title, with Alyssa Healy named player of the match.

In England, the final was simulcast live on Pick, Sky’s free-to-air TV channel.

Route to the Final

Match

Notes

References

!
2022
World Cup 2022
World Cup 2022